The 1953 Little All-America college football team is composed of college football players from small colleges and universities who were selected by the Associated Press (AP) as the best players at each position. For 1953, the AP abandoned the precedent set in 1951 and 1952 of selecting separate offensive and defensive platoons. Instead, the AP returned to the older tradition of selecting 11 players each on first, second, and third teams.

First team
 Back - Pence Dacus (senior, 6'0", 174 pounds), Southwest Texas
 Back - Hugh Pepper (junior, 5'11", 181 pounds), Mississippi Southern
 Back - Leo Lewis (junior, 5'11", 187 pounds), Lincoln (MO)
 Back - Richard Wait (senior, 5'8", 175 pounds), Arkansas State
 End - John Gustafson (senior, 6'1", 185 pounds), St. Olaf
 End - Hall Morrison (senior, 6'2", 185 pounds), East Tennessee
 Tackle - Robert Lade (senior, 6'0", 210 pounds), Peru Teachers
 Tackle - Norman Hayes (senior, 6'1", 215 pounds), College of Idaho
 Guard - Bruno Ashley (senior, 6'1", 234 pounds), East Texas
 Guard - Robert Adams (senior, 6'3", 210 pounds), Shippensburg Teachers
 Center - Stan Sheriff (senior, 6'1", 200 pounds), Cal Poly

Second team
 Back - Jim Gray, East Texas
 Back - Ron Billings, Pacific Lutheran
 Back - Les Goble, Alfred
 Back - Roger Carlson, Gustavus Adolphus
 End - Jim Lee Taylor, Florida State
 End - Sal Cianciola, Lawrence
 Tackle - Glenn Wildt, LaCrosse Teachers
 Tackle - Sam Marshall, Florida A&M
 Guard - Nick Waytovich, Tampa
 Guard - Ronnie Frank, Grinnell
 Center - Albie Carter, Indiana Central

Third team
 Back - Sid Watson, Northeastern
 Back - Joe Hazie, Wofford
 Back - Kent Finanger, Iowa Lutheran
 End - Richard Beetsch, Iowa Teachers
 End - Von Morgan, Abilene Christian
 Tackle - Larry Paradis, Whitworth
 Tackle - Al Lahood, Hofstra
 Guard - Tom Drake, Chattanooga
 Guard - Ron Hofman, St. Lawrence
 Center - Bruce McPherson, Rochester

See also
 1953 College Football All-America Team

References

Little All-America college football team
Little All-America college football teams